The Trial of Lee Harvey Oswald refers to:

 The Trial of Lee Harvey Oswald (1964 film)
 The Trial of Lee Harvey Oswald (1977 film)
 The Trial of Lee Harvey Oswald (play)